Seyyed Abdul Fattah Nawab (also: Abdulfattah Nawab) (born: 1957, Shahreza, Isfahan) is an Iranian Twelver Shia cleric who has been recently appointed as the new representative of Guardianship of the Islamic Jurist in the affairs of Hajj and pilgrimage by the decree of Iran's Supreme leader, Seyyed Ali Khamenei; Nawab, also has the record of activity in the Be'seh of Iran's Supreme leader.

Seyyed Abdul Fattah Nawab was born in 1957 in the city of Shahreza (Isfahan), and commenced his Hawzah education in that city; Later on, he departed to Qom to continue his education, and entered Qom Seminary.

Teachers 

Amongst Seyyed Abdul-Fattah Nawab's
teachers are:

 Mohammad Fazel Lankarani
 Mousa Shubairi Zanjani
 Kazem al-Haeri
 Hussein-Ali Montazeri
 Jawad Tabrizi
 Abdollah Javadi-Amoli
 Morteza Motahhari
 Hassan Hassanzadeh Amoli
 Gholam-Reza Salavati
 Mohammad-Taqi Sotudeh
 Ali Ahmadi Miyanji
 Yahya Ansari Shirazi
 Ali Meshkini

See also 
 Hajj and Pilgrimage Organization (Iran)
 Seyyed Ali Qazi Askar
 Islamic Development Organization

References 

Living people
Shia clerics from Isfahan
1957 births